James Ford (October 16, 1912 – January 1982) was an American Negro league infielder in the 1930s and 1940s.

A native of Memphis, Tennessee, Ford made his Negro leagues debut with the Memphis Red Sox in 1937. He went on to play for several teams, finishing his career back with Memphis for a three-year stint from 1943 to 1945. Ford died in Memphis in 1982 at age 69.

References

External links
 and Seamheads

1912 births
1982 deaths
Date of death missing
Baltimore Elite Giants players
Birmingham Black Barons players
Chicago American Giants players
Harrisburg Stars players
Memphis Red Sox players
St. Louis–New Orleans Stars players
New York Black Yankees players
Philadelphia Stars players
St. Louis Stars (1939) players
Washington Black Senators players
20th-century African-American sportspeople
Baseball infielders